The Cities Service Station #8, at 1648 SW Boulevard in Tulsa, Oklahoma, was built in 1940 by Cities Service in the Modern Movement style.  It was listed on the National Register of Historic Places in 2011.

See also
Cities Service Station, including one in Afton, Oklahoma

References

Gas stations on the National Register of Historic Places in Oklahoma
National Register of Historic Places in Tulsa, Oklahoma
Commercial buildings completed in 1940
Citgo
1940 establishments in Oklahoma
Modern Movement architecture in the United States
U.S. Route 66 in Oklahoma
Transportation in Tulsa, Oklahoma